Liam Davis may refer to:

Liam Davis (footballer, born 1986), English footballer for Torquay United F.C.
Liam Davis (footballer, born 1990), English footballer for Cleethorpes Town F.C.
Liam Davis (cricketer) (born 1984), Australian cricketer
Liam Davis (swimmer) (born 2000), Zimbabwean swimmer

See also
Liam Davies (born 1986), Welsh rugby player
Leon Davis (disambiguation)